Baron Colwyn, of Colwyn Bay in the County of Denbigh, is a title in the Peerage of the United Kingdom. It was created in 1917 for the businessman Sir Frederick Smith, 1st Baronet. He had already been created a Baronet in 1912.  the titles are held by his great-grandson, the third Baron, who succeeded his father in 1966.

The third Lord Colwyn remained in the House of Lords as one of ninety indirectly elected hereditary peers after the passing of the House of Lords Act 1999 and sits on the Conservative benches.

Barons Colwyn (1917)
Frederick Henry Smith, 1st Baron Colwyn (1859–1946)
Frederick John Vivian Smith, 2nd Baron Colwyn (1914–1966)
Ian Anthony Hamilton-Smith, 3rd Baron Colwyn (b. 1942)

The heir apparent is the present holder's son the Hon. Craig Peter Hamilton-Smith (b. 1968)
The heir apparent's heir is his son Joshua Dougal Callum Hamilton-Smith (b. 2006)

References 

Baronies in the Peerage of the United Kingdom
Noble titles created in 1917